This is a list of cemeteries in Israel.

Central District
 Segula Cemetery
 Yarkon Cemetery
 Ramleh War Cemetery (military)

Haifa District
 Sde Yehoshua Cemetery
 Khayat Beach War Cemetery (military)

Jerusalem District

Christian
 Mount Zion Cemetery
 Franciscan Cemetery, Mount Zion

Jewish
 Har HaMenuchot
 Mount of Olives
 Sanhedria Cemetery
 Shaare Zedek Cemetery
 Sheikh Badr Cemetery

Military
 Jerusalem British war cemetery
 Mount Herzl

Muslim
 Mamilla Cemetery

Southern District 
 Tel Shoket (Muslim)

Tel Aviv District
 Kiryat Shaul Cemetery
 Nahalat Yitzhak Cemetery
 Trumpeldor Cemetery

Judea and Samaria Region
(Jewish cemeteries only)
 Old Jewish Cemetery, Hebron

Israel

Cemeteries